Masdevallia fractiflexa is a species of orchid endemic to southeastern Ecuador. It blooms in the winter with a single 2.5 cm wide flower.

References

External links 

fractiflexa
Endemic orchids of Ecuador